Louis Burleigh Bruhl (20 July 1861 – 1942) was an English landscape artist.

Bruhl was born in Bhagdad, Iraq. He was educated in Vienna and England, and studied medicine at the London Hospital.

Burleigh Bruhl was President of the Dudley Gallery Art Society. He was also president of the Watercolour Society.

In 1915 he published Essex water-colours which contained a selection of his Essex scenes. His work included publicity posters for the Great Western Railway.

External links

References

1861 births
1942 deaths
English landscape painters